Wesley Crawford (1901 Indianapolis, Indiana – 9 January 1961) was an American racecar driver.

Indianapolis 500 results

References

1901 births
1961 deaths
Indianapolis 500 drivers
Racing drivers from Indianapolis